The 1986 Oklahoma Sooners football team represented the University of Oklahoma in the 1986 NCAA Division I-A football season. They played their home games at Oklahoma Memorial Stadium and competed as members of the Big Eight Conference. The team recorded 5 shutouts and led the nation in all four major defensive categories (total, rushing, passing, and scoring).

Schedule

Roster

Game summaries

UCLA

Minnesota

Miami (FL)

Kansas State

Texas

Oklahoma State

Iowa State

Kansas

Missouri

Colorado

Nebraska

vs. Arkansas (Orange Bowl)

Rankings

Postseason

NFL draft
The following players were drafted into the National Football League following the season.

Awards and honors
Brian Bosworth, Butkus Award

References

Oklahoma
Oklahoma Sooners football seasons
Big Eight Conference football champion seasons
Orange Bowl champion seasons
Oklahoma Sooners football